"A Day in My Life (Without You)" is the second single from the album Together Forever, released by singer of hip-hop and freestyle music Lisette Melendez in 1991. Although it has not achieved the same success of the previous single, the song was close to becoming a hit, reaching No. 49 on the Billboard Hot 100 on November 9, 1991. In Canada, the song remained on the chart for a week of dance songs, peaking at No. 10.

Track listing

12" single

Charts

References

1991 singles
Lisette Melendez songs
1991 songs